The 2020 Utah Republican presidential primary took place on Super Tuesday, March 3, 2020.

Results
Incumbent United States President Donald Trump was challenged by five candidates: retired advertising executive Robert Ardini of New York, entrepreneur and investor Bob Ely of Massachusetts, entrepreneur and attorney Matthew John Matern of Louisiana, former congressman Joe Walsh of Illinois, and former governor Bill Weld of Massachusetts. Businessman and perennial candidate Rocky De La Fuente was also initially on the ballot, but later withdrew his name to avoid a 'sore loser' law.

Results by county

See also
 2020 Utah Democratic presidential primary

References

Utah
Republican presidential primary
Utah Republican primary
Utah Republican primaries